Francis Gerald Morgan (25 July 1899–1959) was an Irish footballer who played in the Football League for Luton Town and Nottingham Forest.

References

1899 births
1959 deaths
Association football midfielders
English Football League players
Pre-1950 IFA international footballers
Association footballers from Northern Ireland
Cliftonville F.C. players
Linfield F.C. players
Nottingham Forest F.C. players
Luton Town F.C. players
Grantham Town F.C. players
Cork F.C. players
Ballymena F.C. players